Tinta Fina is an alternative name for several wine grape varieties including:

Tempranillo

Alicante Bouschet
Baga (grape)
Grand Noir de la Calmette